Ciliary nerves may refer to:
 Short ciliary nerves
 Long ciliary nerves